The black-headed apalis (Apalis melanocephala) is a species of bird in the family Cisticolidae.
It is found in Kenya, Malawi, Mozambique, Somalia, Tanzania, and Zimbabwe.
Its natural habitats are subtropical or tropical dry forest, subtropical or tropical moist lowland forest, and subtropical or tropical moist montane forest.

References

External links
 Black-headed apalis - Species text in The Atlas of Southern African Birds.

black-headed apalis
Birds of East Africa
black-headed apalis
Taxonomy articles created by Polbot